Skomvær Lighthouse is a coastal lighthouse in Røst Municipality in Nordland county, Norway. The lighthouse was first established in 1887 and it was automated in 1978. The area was listed as a protected site in 1999.

The steel-hulled barque Skomvær takes her name from the lighthouse.

Specifications
The light on top of the tower puts out two white flashes every 30 seconds. The light is on from dusk to sunrise from 4 August until 2 May each year (it is not on during the summers due to the midnight sun in the region). In addition to the light, the tower also emits a Racon signal that is the morse code letter "T".

See also

Lighthouses in Norway
List of lighthouses in Norway

References

External links
 Norsk Fyrhistorisk Forening 
 

Røst
Lighthouses in Nordland
Listed lighthouses in Norway
Lighthouses completed in 1887
1887 establishments in Norway